Florica Vulpeş (born March 13, 1982 in Cornereva) is a Romanian sprint canoer who competed in the mid-2000s. She won two medals at the ICF Canoe Sprint World Championships with a silver (K-4 1000 m: 2005) and a bronze (K-4 500 m: 2006).

Vulpeş also competed in the K-2 500 m event at the 2004 Summer Olympics in Athens, but was eliminated in the semifinals.

References

1982 births
Canoeists at the 2004 Summer Olympics
Living people
Olympic canoeists of Romania
Romanian female canoeists
ICF Canoe Sprint World Championships medalists in kayak